Roman Yuriyovych Yakuba (born 23 April 2001) is a Ukrainian professional footballer who plays as a centre-back for Polish club Puszcza Niepołomice, on loan from Valmiera.

Honours
Valmiera
 Latvian Higher League: 2022

References

External links
 
 

2001 births
Living people
Sportspeople from Lviv
Ukrainian footballers
Ukraine youth international footballers
Ukraine under-21 international footballers
Association football defenders
FC Shakhtar Donetsk players
Valmieras FK players
Puszcza Niepołomice players
Latvian Higher League players

Ukrainian expatriate footballers
Expatriate footballers in Latvia
Ukrainian expatriate sportspeople in Latvia
Expatriate footballers in Poland
Ukrainian expatriate sportspeople in Poland